The women's 50 metre backstroke swimming events for the 2016 Summer Paralympics take place at the Rio Olympic Stadium from 10 to 16 September. A total of four events were contested for four different classifications.

Competition format
Each event consists of two rounds: heats and final. The top eight swimmers overall in the heats progress to the final. If there are eight or fewer swimmers in an event, no heats are held and all swimmers qualify for the final.

Results

S2

19:52 15 September 2016:

S3

18:32 10 September 2016:

S4

18:30 16 September 2016:

S5

19:58 16 September 2016:

References

Swimming at the 2016 Summer Paralympics